Fahad Talib (born 21 October 1994) is an Iraqi professional footballer who plays as a goalkeeper for Iraqi Premier League club Al-Quwa Al-Jawiya and the Iraq national team.

Club career 
The 26 year old has never played for any shaabiya team, but went straight into the Al Quwa Al-Jawiya’s youth system in his early teens and broke into the first team aged just 16 in 2011-12. Fahad followed in his father Talib Rahim and elder brother Ali’s footsteps when he joined the Blue Falcons. Growing up he would sit on the sidelines listening attentively to his father’s advice to Ali. Fahad was supervised by the goalkeeping coach Hashim Khamis, the ex-Iraq and Al-Jawiya goalkeeper, maintaining that the man the Al-Jawiya supporters knew as Al-Tayara (“The Airplane”) had been instrumental in his development, with the Jawiya faithful granting the old nickname of his mentor to their new keeper. At the start of 2014-2015 season Fahad was regarded as the club's third choice keeper behind Noor Sabri and Mohanad Qasim but the club's coach at the time, Nadhim Shaker, gave him his chance and he made the no.1 spot his.
Fahad started his career with Iraqi giants Al Quwa al Jawiya and established himself as a first-team starter in the 2014-15 season. His Impressive performances led him to become a contender for the Olympic team squad. In the 2015/2016 season, Fahad became an instrumental part of the legendary season where Al Quwa Al Jawiya won the first ever Iraqi FA Cup since 2003. Fahad played all matches of the 2016 AFC Cup as Al Quwa Al Jawiya became the first ever Iraqi team to win an Asian club competition.

The following season, Fahad Talib was impressive once again as Al Quwa Al Jawiya won the Iraqi Premier League, and retained the AFC Cup. The man who displaced Noor Sabri as Air Force FC's No.1 keeper has been Abdul-Ghani Shahad’s preferred first choice with the Olympic team from the first day he took charge; Talib started all but one of Iraq's ten 2016 Olympic qualifying matches.

He was decisive in saving a penalty in the West Asian Zonal Final, that allowed Al Jawiya to reach the final.

International career

2016 AFC U-23 Championship

Talib was the starting goal keeper for Iraq U-23  in the 2016 AFC U-23 Championship in Qatar. Iraq went on to finish 3rd and win the Bronze Medal. They qualified for the 2016 Summer Olympics. Fahad lost his place in the olympic team to Mohammed Hameed , Fahad was present in the olympics as the second goalkeeper and did not make an appearance in the games.

Senior

Talib was called up to the senior Iraq squad for a 2018 FIFA World Cup qualifier against Vietnam in March 2016. He made his debut on June 1, 2017
 in a friendly match vs Jordan. He played 45 minutes and kept a clean sheet.

Honours
Al-Quwa Al-Jawiya
 Iraqi Premier League: 2016–17, 2020–21
 Iraq FA Cup: 2015–16, 2020–21
 AFC Cup: 2016, 2017, 2018

Iraq
 Arabian Gulf Cup: 2023

References

External links 
 
 

1994 births
Living people
Iraqi footballers
Iraq international footballers
Al-Quwa Al-Jawiya players
Association football goalkeepers
Footballers at the 2016 Summer Olympics
Olympic footballers of Iraq
AFC Cup winning players
Sportspeople from Baghdad